Emmanuel Clase (born March 18, 1998) is a Dominican professional baseball pitcher for the Cleveland Guardians of Major League Baseball (MLB). 
He signed with the San Diego Padres as an international free agent in 2015. He made his MLB debut in 2019 with the Texas Rangers.

Career
Clase signed with the San Diego Padres as an international free agent on February 11, 2015, for a $125,000 signing bonus. He played for the DSL Padres in 2015, going 2–1 with a 1.99 ERA in 54 innings. In 2016 he played for the AZL Padres, going 2–0 with a 4.01 ERA in  innings. In 2017 he played for the AZL Padres (2), going 2–4 with a 5.30 ERA in  innings, and in one game with the Tri-City Dust Devils of the Class A Short Season Northwest League, allowing 5 runs in  innings.

Texas Rangers
On May 7, 2018, the Padres traded Clase to the Texas Rangers as the player to be named later in an earlier trade for Brett Nicholas. Clase was assigned to the Spokane Indians of the Class A Short Season Northwest League, and finished the 2018 season after going 1–1 with a 0.64 ERA, 27 strikeouts, and 12 saves in  innings. Clase was assigned to the Down East Wood Ducks of the Class A-Advanced Carolina League to open the 2019 season. He appeared in 6 games for them, going 2–0 with a 0.00 ERA, 1 save, and 11 strikeouts in 7 innings. On April 23, he was promoted to the Frisco RoughRiders of the Double-A Texas League, and went 1–2 with a 3.35 ERA and 39 strikeouts over  innings.          

On August 2, 2019, the Rangers selected Clase's contract and promoted him to the MLB. He made his MLB debut on August 4, pitching  scoreless innings. Clase produced a 2–3 record with a 2.31 ERA and 21 strikeouts over  innings in 2019.

Cleveland Indians / Guardians 
On December 15, 2019, the Rangers traded Clase and Delino DeShields Jr. to the Cleveland Indians in exchange for Corey Kluber and cash considerations. Clase was suspended for 80 games on May 1, 2020, after testing positive for Boldenone, a banned PED. Due to the COVID-19 pandemic and the shortening of the 2020 Major League Baseball season to 60 games, Clase's suspension was lifted at the conclusion of the shortened 2020 season.

Clase returned to the Indians' bullpen for the 2021 season. After converting all six save opportunities in August and holding opposing batters to an .095 average, he was named AL Reliever of the Month.

On April 2, 2022, Clase agreed to a five-year $20 million extension with the Cleveland Guardians.

In July 2022, Clase was named to his first All-Star team. He pitched the ninth inning for the American League at Dodger Stadium and struck out the side to get the save and secure a 3–2 victory.

In 2022 he was 3–4 with a 1.36 ERA in 72.2 innings, and lead the MLB in saves. He compiled 42 in 46 opportunities.

Pitching style
Clase features an upper 90s/low 100s mph cut fastball and a low 90s slider.

References

External links

1998 births
Living people
American League All-Stars
Arizona League Padres players
Cleveland Guardians players
Cleveland Indians players
Dominican Republic expatriate baseball players in the United States
Dominican Republic sportspeople in doping cases
Dominican Summer League Padres players
Down East Wood Ducks players
Estrellas Orientales players
Frisco RoughRiders players
Major League Baseball pitchers
Major League Baseball players from the Dominican Republic
Major League Baseball players suspended for drug offenses
People from María Trinidad Sánchez Province
Spokane Indians players
Texas Rangers players
Tri-City Dust Devils players